Upper Agryle, or Agryle Kathyperthen, was a deme of ancient Attica, one of two demoi of Agryle.

The site of Upper Agryle is located southwest of modern Ardettos.

References

Populated places in ancient Attica
Former populated places in Greece
Demoi